Mum is a 2017 Hindi drama short film directed and produced by Akash Mihani and written by Jackie R. Bala. The film is focused on destroying long run worldwide issue of female infanticide and child abandonment. Mum is marked as directorial debut of Akash Mihani.

The short film was initially released on 11 August 2017, on the festival circuit and received positive reviews and acclamation around the world. The short film Mum has bagged more than 27 awards and nearly 70 nominations. Apart from India, the film is selected for several film festivals in the United States, Georgia, Vietnam, Russia, Belgium, Canada, Swtizerland, Spain, China, Ukraine, Sweden, Russia and Kenya, reportedly by Firstpost.

Cast
 Gunn Mihani as Mamta
 Inayat Kazi as the Teacher
 Nitesh Upadhyay as Baba (Mamta's Father)

Plot 
The story is about Mamta, an 8-year-old school girl, who is struggling with her homework. Mamta garners the attention of her strict teacher as she narrates an unwritten essay on Mother, leaving the teacher unvoiced. The story is inspired by a real-life incident in Mandsaur district of Madhya Pradesh, where a five-hour-old girl was dumped in a pile of ashes with a 10 kg stone kept on her chest, making sure she dies of the weight.

Awards 
 Best Short Film
Calcutta International Cult Film Festival, Kolkata
 New Delhi Short Film Festival, Delhi
Lake View International Film Festival, Punjab
Best Child Actress 
LIFFT India Filmotsav, Lonavala
Best Debut Director
 Oniros Film Awards, Italy
Best Director
Lake View International Film Festival, Punjab
Great Message International Film Festival, Pune
Nottingham International Microfilm Festival
Gold Awards
LA Shorts Awards, Los Angeles, US
Audience Choice Award
Free Spirit Film Festival, Himachal Pradesh
Excellence Award
Shaan-E-Awadh International Film Festival, Lucknow
Silver Award
Spotlight Short Film Awards, Atlanta, Georgia
Honorable Jury Mention Award 
 Mumbai International Short Film Festival, Mumbai
Best Child Artist
Haryana International Film Festival, Hisar
Best Concept 
Mumbai Short Film Festival, Mumbai
Best Asian Short 
Asia South East Short Film Festival, Ho Chi Minh City, Vietnam
 Best Social Concern Film
Global Short Film Awards, Cannes
 Best Young Talent
Global Short Film Awards, Cannes
 Women's Voice (B'Oscars)
Beeston Film Festival, Beeston, UK

References

External links 
 
 

2017 films
Indian short films
2010s Hindi-language films